Stanley Gilbert Tobin (January 19, 1871 - June 12, 1948) was a farmer, businessman, teacher and political figure in Alberta, Canada. Tobin served as a Member of the Legislative Assembly of Alberta and a Member of the House of Commons of Canada.

Born in Bridgewater, Nova Scotia, Tobin ran in the Leduc provincial electoral district in the 1913 Alberta general election. He was elected in a hotly contested election by just over 100 votes against Conservative George Curry.

He would see re-election in 1917 and in 1921. His plurality in the 1921 election was just 10 votes.

Stanley vacated his provincial seat in 1925 to run in the 1925 Canadian federal election in the Wetaskiwin Federal electoral district. He won election as a member of the Liberal Party of Canada. In that election he defeated incumbent Progressive incumbent Daniel Webster Warner.

He only served in office for one year and was defeated in the 1926 Canadian Federal Election by William Irvine.

External links
 
 

1871 births
1948 deaths
Alberta Liberal Party MLAs
Liberal Party of Canada MPs
Members of the House of Commons of Canada from Alberta
People from Bridgewater, Nova Scotia